The WSPU Holloway Banner is a suffragette banner designed by Scottish artist Ann Macbeth.

Origin 
The banner consists of 80 pieces of linen, each embroidered with the signatures of those women who had participated in hunger strikes in support of the cause of women's suffrage. The pieces are bordered by green and purple. Along the top is embroidered "Women's Social and Political Union" in the Art Nouveau style. Also at the top are the names of some leaders of the women's suffrage movement, Annie Kenney, Christabel Pankhurst and Emmeline Pankhurst.

The banner was originally designed as a friendship quilt, and converted into a banner with the addition of carrying poles. It was donated by Macbeth to a bazaar held by the W.S.P.U. at Charing Cross Halls in Glasgow on 28 April 1910. It was bought for £10 by Emmeline Pethick-Lawrence, Baroness Pethick-Lawrence.

The banner was carried in the 'From Prison to Citizenship' procession held in June 1910.

Women named on banner

See also 
Image of banner at Museum of London: https://collections.museumoflondon.org.uk/online/object/91239.html

References 

Women's Social and Political Union
Women's suffrage in the United Kingdom
Feminism and the arts
Quilts